Sebastian Hohenthal (born 5 November 1984 in Mora) is a former racing driver from Sweden.

Career

Karting
Hohenthal competed in kart racing from 1995 to 2000. During this period he won the Dalacupen Formula Micro in 1996, the Tom Trana Trophy ICA Junior in 1999, and both the Nordic and Swedish ICA Junior championships in 2000.

Formula Ford
Hohenthal stepped up to formula racing in 2001, driving in the local Nordic and Swedish Formula Ford championships.  In 2003, driving for rally driver Stig Blomqvist's team, he won both titles. In the same year, he moved to the United Kingdom racing scene to drive for the Nexa Racing team. His first racing in this country was the British Formula Ford Championship's Winter Series, which he also won.

This was a precursor to a full-time entry in the main 2004 series, in which he finished third in the championship. He also finished in this position in that year's Formula Ford Festival at the Brands Hatch circuit, setting fastest lap in the process.

Formula Renault
For 2005, Hohenthal moved up to the British Formula Renault Championship with the Fortec Motorsport team. He finished in fourth place in his first season in the category, and then returned to win the series in 2006, taking five pole positions and seven wins from the championship's twenty races in the course of doing so.

He also competed in one round of the Asian Formula Renault Challenge in 2006, not scoring any points.

Formula Three

Hohenthal continued his partnership with Fortec in the British Formula Three Championship for 2007, taking a win at Brands Hatch and a pole position at Thruxton en route to ninth place in the championship. He remained with Fortec in the championship for 2008 and won another race at Rockingham, but withdrew from the series after the Spa races, when it became apparent that he could not compete for the drivers' championship.

Formula Two
Hohenthal signed to drive for the relaunched FIA Formula Two Championship in 2009. Sadly for Hohenthal, the results did not materialise as he only finished in the points twice – both races at Donington Park – as he finished sixteenth in the championship.

Retirement
After his disappointing Formula Two campaign Hohenthal decided to retire from active driving, realizing that he would not be able to gather enough money to step up to Formula One or GP2, as he explained on his web site. He joined Hello Sweden, a company that supports young athletes and racing drivers, and set up his own Hohenthal Racing Academy which opened in May 2010.

Racing record

Career summary

Complete FIA Formula Two Championship results
(key) (Races in bold indicate pole position) (Races in italics indicate fastest lap)

References

External links
Hohenthal's official website
Sebastian Hohenthal career details at driverdb.com

1984 births
Living people
Swedish racing drivers
Formula Ford drivers
British Formula Renault 2.0 drivers
Asian Formula Renault Challenge drivers
British Formula Three Championship drivers
FIA Formula Two Championship drivers
Fluid Motorsport Development drivers
Fortec Motorsport drivers